Fella Precious Makafui (born 19 August, 1995 in Volta Region, Ghana) is a Ghanaian actress and a philanthropist. She is known mostly for her role in Yolo (Ghanaian TV series).

She is married to the singer and rapper Medikal and they have a daughter (born 8/2020) called Island.

Education 
Fella attended Kpando Senior high and graduated. After her high school she attended the University of Ghana.

Career 
Makafui started her career as a model, she later went into acting which brought her to limelight  when she starred in the popular YOLO (You Only Live Once) television series. Fella was featured in a couple movies like Swings, Once upon a family, Kanda River and Chaskele. In once upon a family, Fella got to work alongside Nigerian actress Mercy Johnson who played the lead role. She is currently the new ambassador of Castle gate Estate.

Awards 
 Most Promising Actress of the Year - City People Entertainment Award (2016)
 Golden Most Promising - Golden Movie Awards 2016

References 

Living people
1995 births
People from Volta Region
Ghanaian actresses
Ghanaian television actresses